Hail Destroyer is Cancer Bats' second full-length album. It was released on April 22, 2008 by Distort Entertainment in Canada and on June 24, 2008 by Metal Blade Records in the US.

In 2009, Hail Destroyer was reissued in some regions with four bonus tracks (one new song and three cover songs) in addition to a DVD featuring live footage of the Cancer Bats. The bonus tracks were also released separately as an extended play dubbed the Tour EP on June 30, 2009.  Videos were filmed for "Hail Destroyer", "Deathsmarch" and "Lucifer's Rocking Chair".

The title track was featured briefly in the 2009 sci-fi horror film Splice.

Track listing

Personnel
Cancer Bats
Liam Cormier – lead vocals
Scott Middleton – lead & rhythm guitars, bass, backing vocals
Mike Peters – drums, percussion, backing vocals

Additional musicians
Wade MacNeil – guest vocals on "Deathsmarch"
Ben Kowalewicz – guest vocals on "Smiling Politely"
Tim McIlrath – guest vocals on "Harem of Scorpions"
Gang vocals by Jaye Schwarzer, Mike Peters, Scott Middleton, Billy Hamilton, Juice, Travis Porter, xHambonex, Adam Sylvester

Production
Produced and engineered by Eric Ratz and Kenny Luong
Mixed by Eric Ratz, Greg Below and Kenny Luong
Mastered by Scott Lake
Design and art direction by Doublenaut
Illustrations by Alex Snelgrove

Accolades

 "Hail Destroyer" was placed at #3 in Kerrang! magazine's 2008 "End of the Year" list.

Trivia
 The song "Zed's Dead, Baby" is in reference to a line spoken by Bruce Willis' character Butch, in the film Pulp Fiction.

Reviews
 Cancer Bats - Hail Destroyer - CD Review

References

External links
"Hail Destroyer" album lyrics

2008 albums
Hassle Records albums
Cancer Bats albums
Distort Entertainment albums